Mokhnatushka is a rural locality (a settlement) in Barnaul, Altai Krai, Russia. The population was 262 as of 2013. There are 7 streets.

Geography 
Mokhnatushka is located 27 km southwest of Barnaul by road. Chernitsk is the nearest rural locality.

References 

Rural localities in Barnaul urban okrug